Robert-Charles Martin (1877—1949) was a French composer, organist and teacher.

Life
Martin lived in the French port city of Le Havre (Seine-Maritime) where he held the position of organist at the city's church of St Michel.
Among his pupils was the composer Arthur Honegger who dedicated his first published work to Martin.

Works
Martin was a prolific composer, particularly of solo keyboard works (for harmonium, organ and piano), chamber music, vocal music, and pedagogical texts.
His published works comprise more than 150 items.

External links
 'Élévation' (Parnasse des Organistes ... First series, vol.1. 1911), performed by Andrew Pink.
 Public domain copies of works by Robert-Charles Martin at IMSLP.

References

1877 births
1947 deaths
19th-century organists
20th-century organists
French classical organists
French composers
French male composers
French male classical composers
Musicians from Le Havre
19th-century French male musicians
20th-century French male musicians